Nesi 6 - Coptic Calenadar - Thout 2

The first day of the Coptic month of Thout, the first month of the Coptic year. On a common year, this day corresponds to August 29, of the Julian Calendar, and September 11, of the Gregorian Calendar. This day falls in the Coptic season of Akhet, the season of inundation.

Commemorations

Feasts 
 Feast of El Nayrouz (Coptic New Year)

Saints 
 The martyrdom of Saint Bartholomew the Apostle
 The departure of Pope Milius, the third Patriarch of the See of Saint Mark
 The departure of Pope Mark V, the ninety-eighth Patriarch of the See of Saint Mark

Other commemorations 
 The Healing of the Righteous Job

References 

Days of the Coptic calendar